Donnell Eugene Harvey (born August 26, 1980) is an American retired professional basketball player. He previously played in the National Basketball Association (NBA) for the New Jersey Nets, Denver Nuggets, Dallas Mavericks, Orlando Magic, and Phoenix Suns.

High school career
Harvey was born in Shellman, Georgia.  He attended Randolph-Clay High School in Cuthbert, Georgia where he was the consensus 1999 national high school player of the year. In 1999, he was in the McDonald's All-America Game, was in the USA Today All-USA 1st Team in 1999, and got the Naismith Award as nation's top high school player in 1999.

College career
Harvey accepted an athletic scholarship to attend the University of Florida in Gainesville, Florida, where he played for coach Billy Donovan's Florida Gators men's basketball team during the 1999–2000 season.  After starting three-fourths of the Gators' first 12 games, he lost his starting spot to Brent Wright after returning home over the New Year's break because of homesickness.  Harvey averaged 10.2 points, 7.0 rebounds and 1.0 assists per game  and was voted to the SEC All-Freshman Team in his only season playing college basketball.

Professional career
Harvey was selected by the New York Knicks with the 22nd overall pick of the 2000 NBA Draft and then traded, along with John Wallace, to the Mavericks in exchange for Erick Strickland and Pete Mickeal. He was in Dallas until he was traded to the Denver Nuggets in February 2002. Harvey then latched on to the Orlando Magic in September 2003, only to be traded to the Phoenix Suns in December 2003. He was signed then waived by the Atlanta Hawks in October 2004. Harvey joined the Sioux Falls Skyforce of the Continental Basketball Association (CBA) in December 2004. He was called up to the New Jersey Nets in February 2005 but was waived 2 weeks later after only playing 3 games for team.

Harvey's final NBA game ever was played on February 13, 2005, in a 94–79 win over the Denver Nuggets. Harvey played for 2 minutes and the only stat he recorded was 1 rebound.

Harvey then played for Panionios (Greece) from September 2005 until March 2006. He then went to Beşiktaş (Turkey) in 2006–07, then later went to Rieti (Italy) in July 2007.

Harvey has also played for Banvitspor in Turkey and the Carolina Giants in Puerto Rico (2009). In November 2010, Harvey signed with the Bosnian club KK Igokea.

After playing for Jiangsu in the Chinese Basketball Association for the 2008–09 and 2009–10 seasons, Harvey played 32 games with Tianjin Ronggang for the 2011–12 season, averaging 24.7 points and 14.7 rebounds per game.

He joined the Talk 'N Text Tropang Texters replacing the injured Omar Samhan for the 2012 PBA Commissioner's Cup. He led the Texters to the finals, but the team ultimately lost to the B-Meg Llamados 4–3. During Game 7 of the Finals, he fouled out late in the 4th quarter despite having a superb performance. Later that year, he returned to Tianjin Ronggang. In 2013, he rejoined the Talk 'N Text Tropang Texters. However, he left the team midseason to be with his children in the United States as they recovered from a car accident.

References

External links
NBA profile

1980 births
Living people
African-American basketball players
American expatriate basketball people in Bosnia and Herzegovina
American expatriate basketball people in China
American expatriate basketball people in Greece
American expatriate basketball people in the Philippines
American expatriate basketball people in Turkey
American men's basketball players
Bandırma B.İ.K. players
Basketball players from Georgia (U.S. state)
Beşiktaş men's basketball players
Dallas Mavericks draft picks
Dallas Mavericks players
Denver Nuggets players
Florida Gators men's basketball players
Greek Basket League players
Jiangsu Dragons players
KK Igokea players
McDonald's High School All-Americans
New Jersey Nets players
Orlando Magic players
Panionios B.C. players
Parade High School All-Americans (boys' basketball)
People from Cuthbert, Georgia
People from Shellman, Georgia
Philippine Basketball Association imports
Phoenix Suns players
Power forwards (basketball)
Shandong Hi-Speed Kirin players
Sioux Falls Skyforce (CBA) players
Small forwards
Tianjin Pioneers players
TNT Tropang Giga players
21st-century African-American sportspeople
20th-century African-American people